Daniel Lorenzo Hackett (born December 19, 1987) is an American-Italian professional basketball player for Virtus Bologna of the Italian Lega Basket Serie A (LBA) and the EuroLeague.

Early life
Hackett was born in Forlimpopoli, (Forlì-Cesena), Italy. He was born as the son of Rudy Hackett, an American professional basketball player, who played in both the ABA and the NBA, and an Italian mother. He grew up in Pesaro, Italy.

High school career
Hackett left Italy to attend high school at St. John Bosco High School of Bellflower, California, in the United States.

College career
Hackett studied at the University of Southern California, where he played college basketball. Starting with his freshman year, he was the USC Trojans' point guard, and with the Trojans he played in the NCAA Tournament three times. On November 17, 2007, Hackett had his first triple double with the Trojans', putting on the score sheet 22 points, 10 rebounds, and 10 assists.

Professional career

Seasons in Italy, Greece and Germany (2009–2018)
After going undrafted in the 2009 NBA draft, Hacket signed a one-year deal with Benetton Treviso of the Italian LBA. In July 2010, he signed a two-year deal with Scavolini Pesaro.

In 2012, he signed a two-year deal with the Italian team Montepaschi Siena. In his first season with the team, he was named, both Italian League Finals and Italian Cup most valuable player. Also, in his first career EuroLeague season, he averaged 7.2 points, 3 assists, and 2.3 rebounds over 22 games. On December 24, 2013, he signed a three-year deal with EA7 Emporio Armani Milano. On June 19, 2015, he parted ways with Milano.

On July 15, 2015, Hackett signed a two-year contract with the Greek club Olympiacos. With Olympiacos, he won the 2016 Greek League championship. 

On July 5, 2017, Hackett signed a two-year contract with German club Brose Bamberg.

CSKA Moscow (2018–2022)
After one season, he parted ways with Brose and signed with the Russian club CSKA Moscow on July 17, 2018. On February 13, 2020, he signed a two-year contract extension with CSKA. With CSKA, Hackett won the club's eighth EuroLeague title in 2019.

Hackett terminated the contract with CSKA in February 2022 due to the country's invasion of Ukraine. Hackett paid CSKA $100,000 to free himself.

Virtus Bologna (2022–present)
Hackett signed with Virtus Bologna of the Italian Lega Basket Serie A in 2022. After having ousted Lietkabelis, Ulm and Valencia in the first three rounds of the playoffs, on 11 May 2022, Virtus defeated Frutti Extra Bursaspor by 80–67 at the Segafredo Arena, winning its first EuroCup and qualifying for the EuroLeague after 14 years. However, despite having ended the regular season at the first place and having ousted 3–0 both Pesaro and Tortona in the first two rounds of playoffs, Virtus was defeated 4–2 in the national finals by Olimpia Milan.

On 29 September 2022, after having ousted Milano in the semifinals, Virtus won its third Supercup, defeating 72–69 Banco di Sardegna Sassari and achieving a back-to-back, following the 2021 trophy. However, Hackett did not play due to an injury.

International career

Hackett played with the Italian junior national teams. With Italy's junior national team, he played at the 2007 FIBA Europe Under-20 Championship, where he won a bronze medal. He averaged 9.1 points, 3.9 rebounds, and 2.0 assists per game at that tournament.

Hackett was then a member of the senior men's Italian national basketball team at the EuroBasket 2011, in Lithuania. He was also a member of the senior Italian national team that took part in EuroBasket 2015, which started on 5 September. He also played at the 2016 Turin FIBA World Olympic Qualifying Tournament.

Career statistics

|-
| style="text-align:left;"| 2012–13
| style="text-align:left;" rowspan=3| Montepaschi/Olimpia Milano
| EuroLeague
| 22 || 22.1 || .414 || .311 || .722 || 2.3 || 3.0 || 1.0 || .0 || 7.2 
|-
| style="text-align:left;"| 2013–14
| EuroLeague
| 27 || 28.7 || .390 || .346 || .733 || 3.7 || 4.3 || 1.2 || .0 || 10.9
|-
| style="text-align:left;"| 2014–15
| EuroLeague
| 24 || 28.7 || .390 || .250 || .658 || 3.7 || 4.6 || .8 || .0 || 10.5
|-
| style="text-align:left;"| 2015–16
| style="text-align:left;" rowspan=2| Olympiacos
| EuroLeague
| 24 || 19.5 || .481 || .393 || .813 || 2.3 || 2.3 || .8 || .1 || 8.1 
|-
| style="text-align:left;"| 2016–17
| EuroLeague
| 11 || 14.3 || .394 || .267 || .773 || 1.5 || 1.6 || .5 || .0 || 5.0
|-
| style="text-align:left;"| 2017–18
| style="text-align:left;"| Brose Bamberg
| EuroLeague
| 26 || 24.0 || .497 || .369 || .808 || 2.7 || 3.4 || .4 || .0 || 9.6
|-
| style="text-align:left| 2018–19
| style="text-align:left;" rowspan=4| CSKA Moscow
| EuroLeague
| 35 || 17.4 || .434 || .392 || .825 || 1.8 || 1.7 || .6 || .0 || 6.0
|-
| style="text-align:left;"| 2019–20
| EuroLeague
| 23 || 20.0 || .395 || .442 || .806 || 2.6 || 2.7 || 1.0 || .3 || 8.3
|-
| style="text-align:left;"| 2020–21
| EuroLeague
| 29 || 24.0 || .446 || .453 || .848 || 2.7 || 2.3 || 1.0 || .0 || 9.5
|-
| style="text-align:left;"| 2021–22
| EuroLeague
| 17 || 20.1 || .444 || .317 || .704 || 1.6 || 2.1 || 0.9 || .5 || 6.6
|-
|-class=sortbottom
| align="center" colspan=3 | Career
| 260 || 23.9 || .436 || .338 || .757 || 3.0 || 3.1 || 1.1 || .1 || 9.2

References

External links
Daniel Hackett at draftexpress.com
Daniel Hackett at eurobasket.com
Daniel Hackett at euroleague.net
Daniel Hackett at fiba.com (archive)
Daniel Hackett at fibaeurope.com
Daniel Hackett at legabasket.it 
Daniel Hackett at baskethotel.com 
Daniel Hackett at esake.gr 
Daniel Hackett at sports-reference.com (college stats)

1987 births
Living people
2019 FIBA Basketball World Cup players
American expatriate basketball people in Germany
American expatriate basketball people in Greece
American expatriate basketball people in Russia
American men's basketball players
Brose Bamberg players
Italian expatriate basketball people in Germany
Italian expatriate basketball people in Greece
Italian expatriate basketball people in Russia
Italian men's basketball players
Italian people of American descent
Lega Basket Serie A players
Mens Sana Basket players
Olimpia Milano players
Olympiacos B.C. players
Pallacanestro Treviso players
PBC CSKA Moscow players
People from Pesaro
Point guards
Shooting guards
Sportspeople from the Province of Pesaro and Urbino
USC Trojans men's basketball players
Victoria Libertas Pallacanestro players
Virtus Bologna players
Sportspeople from the Province of Forlì-Cesena